Ali Moumen (born March 31, 1977) is an Algerian football player who is currently playing as a midfielder for NA Hussein Dey in the Algerian Championnat National.

Club career
 1995-2004 MC Oran 
 2004-2005 ASM Oran 
 2005-2006 USM Blida 
 2006-2007 MC Oran 
 2007-pres. ES Sétif

Honours
 Won the Arab Champions League once with ES Sétif in 2008
 Won the Algerian Cup once with MC Oran in 1996
 Won the Algerian League Cup once with MC Oran in 1996
 Won the Arab Cup Winners Cup two times with MC Oran in 1997 and 1998
 Won the Arab Super Cup once with MC Oran in 1999
 Finalist of the Arab Champions League once with MC Oran in 2001
 Runner-up of the Algerian League three times with MC Oran in 1996, 1997 and 2000
 Finalist of the Algerian Cup twice with MC Oran in 1998 and 2002
 Has 2 caps for the Algerian National Team

References
 

1977 births
Algerian footballers
Algeria international footballers
Living people
Footballers from Oran
MC Oran players
ES Sétif players
USM Blida players
MC Saïda players
ASM Oran players
Association football midfielders
21st-century Algerian people